The following is a list of lakes in Oklahoma located entirely (or partially, as in the case of Lake Texoma) in the state. Oklahoma has more than 200 lakes created by dams. All lakes listed are man-made.  Oklahoma's only natural lakes are oxbow and playa lakes. Oklahoma has sixty-two oxbow lakes at least 10 acres in size.  The largest, near the Red River in McCurtain County is 272 acres.

Playa lakes are found in saucer-shaped depressions in the high plains region.   They are usually intermittent, holding water only after rains.  Oklahoma has about 600 playa lakes.

Lakes and reservoirs by size

Ranked by surface acres, Lake Eufaula is the 34th largest lake in the United States and Lake Texoma is the 38th largest.

Some inconsistencies exist between the two sources.

Lakes geography and administration

Lakes and reservoirs (alphabetically)

 Altus City Reservoir
 Lake Altus-Lugert
 American Horse Lake
 Lake of the Arbuckles
 Arcadia Lake
 Ardmore City Lake
 Atoka Lake
 Bellcow Lake
 Birch Lake
 Lake Bixhoma
 Bluestem Lake
 Boomer Lake
 Broken Bow Lake
 Brushy Lake (Sallisaw, Oklahoma)

 Lake Burtschi
 Canton Lake
 Carl Albert Lake
 Carl Blackwell Lake
 Lake Carl Etling	
 Lake Carlton
 Carter Lake
 Cedar Lake
 Chandler Lake
 Lake Checotah
 Chickasha Lake
 Chouteau Lock & Dam (MKARNS L&D #15)
 Claremore Lake
 Clayton Lake
 Clear Creek Lake
 Cleveland City Lake
 Clinton Lake
 Coalgate City Lake
 Comanche Lake
 Copan Lake
 Cordell Reservoir
 Crowder Lake
 Cushing Municipal Lake
 Lake Dahlgren
 Dead Warrior Lake
 Dripping Springs Lake
 Lake Durant
 Lake Ellsworth
 Lake Elmer
 Lake El Reno
 Lake Eucha
 Evans Chambers Lake
 Foss Reservoir
 Fort Cobb Reservoir
 Fort Supply Lake
 Lake Frederick
 Fuqua Lake
 Newt Graham Reservoir (MKARNS L&D 18)
 Greenleaf Lake
 Grand Lake O' the Cherokees
 Great Salt Plains Lake

 Guthrie Lake
 John Paul Hammerschmidt Lake
 Heyburn Lake
 Hobart Lake (a.k.a. Rocky Lake)
 Holdenville Lake
 Lake Hudson (formerly named Markham Ferry Reservoir)
 Hulah Lake
 Lake Humphreys
 Hugo Lake
 Lake Jean Neustadt
 Lake Jed Johnson
 Keystone Lake
 Konawa Reservoir
 Lake Lawtonka
 Liberty Lake
 Lloyd Church Lake
 Lake Lloyd Vincent       
 Lone Chimney Lake
 W. D. Mayo Reservoir (MKARNS L&D #14)
 Lake McAlester|McAlester Lake
 Lake McMurtry
 Mountain Lake
 Lake Murray
 Oklahoma Lake
 Okmulgee Lake
 Okemah Lake

 Oologah Lake
 Lake Overholser
 Ozzie Cobb Lake
 Pine Creek Lake
 Pauls Valley Lake
 Ponca Lake, Ponca City lake
 Pretty Water Lake
 Lake R.C. Longmire
 Raymond Gary Lake
 Rock Creek Reservoir
 Sahoma Lake
 Sardis Lake
 Shawnee Twin Lakes
 Skiatook Lake
 Skipout Lake
 Sooner Lake
 Lake Spavinaw
 Sportsman Lake
 Spring Creek Lake
 Stroud Lake
 Lake Stanley Draper
 Tom Steed Reservoir
 Lake Talequah
 Elmer Thomas Lake
 Lake Thunderbird
 Watonga Lake
 Waurika Lake
 Wes Watkins
 Lake Wayne Wallace
 Webbers Falls Reservoir (MKARNS L&D #16)
 Wes Watkins Reservoir
 Wewoka Lake
 Lake Wister
 Lake W. R. Holway
 Lake Yahola

See also

 List of rivers of Oklahoma

Notes

References

External links
 Oklahoma Lakes information on TravelOK.com Official Oklahoma Tourism & Recreation Department website
 Oklahoma Lakes
 Oklahoma Department of Wildlife Conservation homepage
 Oklahoma Lake Levels
 Oklahoma Digital Maps: Digital Collections of Oklahoma and Indian Territory

Lakes
Oklahoma